Abbot Pass lies between Mount Lefroy and Mount Victoria, in the divide between the valleys of Lake O'Hara and Lake Louise. It was named for Philip Stanley Abbot who died in 1896 in an attempt to climb Mount Lefroy with Charles Fay, Charles Thompson, and George T. Little.

Abbot Pass has a stone hut, built in 1922 by Swiss guides working for the Canadian Pacific Railway, now maintained by the Alpine Club of Canada.

Climate

Based on the Köppen climate classification, Abbot Pass is located in a subarctic climate zone with cold, snowy winters, and mild summers. Winter temperatures can drop below −20 °C with wind chill factors below −30 °C.

Gallery

References

Banff National Park
Mountain passes of Alberta
Mountain passes of British Columbia
Mountains of Yoho National Park